Deltaspis variabilis is a species of beetle in the family Cerambycidae. It was described by Henry Walter Bates in 1891. They are 10-14mm long. They are generally red with blue-black borders on the anterior and posterior of the thorax and the sutural and basal margins of the wing case.

References

Deltaspis
Beetles described in 1891